José Moustache (March 2, 1932 – February 7, 2013) was a politician from Guadeloupe who served in the French National Assembly from 1978 to 1981. Moustache also served as the President of the Regional Council of Guadeloupe (the head of government) from 1983 until 1986.

Moustache served as the mayor of Anse-Bertrand, Guadeloupe, from 1965 until 1995, when he was defeated for re-election by Alfred Dona-Erie. He became mayor again in 2001, serving until 2006.

José Moustache died on February 7, 2013, at the age of 80 in his birthplace of Pointe-a-Pitre, Guadeloupe.

References 

José Moustache page on the French National Assembly website

1932 births
2013 deaths
People from Pointe-à-Pitre
Guadeloupean politicians
Rally for the Republic politicians
Deputies of the 6th National Assembly of the French Fifth Republic
Presidents of the Regional Council of Guadeloupe
Mayors of places in Guadeloupe